Spodnje Pijavško (in older sources also Dolenje Pijavško) is a settlement on the right bank of the Sava River in the Municipality of Krško in eastern Slovenia. The area is part of the traditional region of Lower Carniola and is now included with the rest of the municipality in the Lower Sava Statistical Region.

References

External links
Spodnje Pijavško on Geopedia

Populated places in the Municipality of Krško